Etmißl was an Austrian municipality in the District of Bruck-Mürzzuschlag, Styria.

As of 1 January 2015 it has been incorporated into Thörl.

Geography
Etmißl is located in a side valley of the Hochschwab.

Its boroughs were Etmißl, Lonschitz, and Oisching.

References

Cities and towns in Bruck-Mürzzuschlag District